Carex lindleyana is a tussock-forming species of perennial sedge in the family Cyperaceae. It is native to parts of India, Sri Lanka and Vietnam.

It was described by the botanist Christian Gottfried Daniel Nees von Esenbeck in 1834 as published in Contributions to the Botany of India. It has one synonym; Carex thyrsiflora.

See also
List of Carex species

References

lindleyana
Plants described in 1834
Taxa named by Christian Gottfried Daniel Nees von Esenbeck
Flora of Sri Lanka
Flora of Vietnam
Flora of India (region)